Hommel is a German surname. Notable people with the surname include:

Christian Hommel (born 1981), German ice hockey player
Conrad Hommel (1883–1971), German painter
Fritz Hommel (1854–1936), German Orientalist
Jane Franklin Hommel (1878–1946)
Johann Hommel (1518–1562), German astronomer and mathematician
Sascha Hommel (born 1990), German motorcycle racer
Ulrich Hommel

Other uses
Hommel (crater), a lunar crater, named for Johann Hommel
Hummel (instrument) (variant spelling), Northern European box zither

German-language surnames